LaserPerformance is an Anglo-American dinghy manufacturer- the world's largest producer of small sailboats. LaserPerformance manufactures many sailboats including: Laser, Sunfish, Laser Pico, Bug, Laser Vago, Laser Bahia, Club FJ, Club 420, Z420, Vanguard 15, Dart 16, Funboat  and Optimists.

They are most well known for the Sunfish and The Laser – a single handed boat which is sailed in the Summer Olympic Games. Over the last 60 years, the Sunfish has become the most popular recreational sailboat in history. The Laser is widely accepted as the world’s most popular adult & youth racing class.

LaserPerformance is also well known for its Sunfish Stand Up Paddleboards and Seitech dollies and racking systems.

Background

On a phone call between Canadians Bruce Kirby and Ian Bruce in 1969, the pair discussed the possibility of a car-topped dinghy (a boat small enough to be carried on a roof rack of a typical car) for a line of camping equipment. Kirby resultantly sketched out what would be known as "the million dollar doodle." Following his "doodle" Kirby developed working drawings that Ian Bruce used to develop the Laser.

The plans stayed with Kirby and Bruce until 1970 when One Design and Offshore Yachtsman magazine held a regatta for boats under $1000, called "America's Teacup." After a few sail modifications, the Laser easily won its class.

The prototype was originally named the "Weekender"; the sail held the letters TGIF, a common American abbreviation for "Thank God It's Friday." Ian Bruce renamed the boat the "Laser" (after the scientific mechanism), and officially unveiled at the New York Boat Show in 1971.

The first world championship was held in 1974 in Bermuda. The Laser became a men's Olympic-class boat at the 1996 Summer Olympics in Atlanta, with a special Olympic edition of the boat released that year in commemoration. A version with a smaller sail, the Laser Radial, was first sailed as a women's Olympic-class boat at the 2008 Summer Olympics. Followed by a youth version known as the 4.7.

History
Neither Bruce nor Kirby had the financial or manufacturing capability to mass-produce and market the boat, and so sold a series of manufacturing licenses to existing boat manufacturers, each with an exclusive geographic sales region:
Europe: Performance Sailcraft based in Long Buckby, Northampton, England
North America: Vanguard Sailboats of Portsmouth, RI
Australia and Oceania: Performance Sailcraft Australia
Each was licensed to manufacture the basic craft, under strict one design rules. Each builder produced the Laser 1 and 2 but it was LaserPerformance Europe which diluted the brand most by introducing boats such as the Laser 2000, Laser 4000, Laser 5000, Laser Bahia, Laser SB3. The company was also responsible the Dart Catamaran brand, and a range of rotomoulded plastic dinghies.

In 2007 Performance Sailcraft Europe and Vanguard merged to create LaserPerformance. This changed the business model from being a licensed boat builder, to a lifestyle brand that manufactured and distributed dinghies and other water sports related products. LaserPerformance also introduced SailLaser centers with the goal of promoting sailing and bringing the community of sailors together through training programs, events, leasing of boats and social activities. Sailors are globally connected to pursue common interests by becoming members of LaserPerformance United, where LaserPerformance helps facilitate activities and suggests member-run initiatives.

Sunfish

The Sunfish sailboat is a personal size, beach launched sailing dinghy utilizing a pontoon type hull carrying a lateen sail mounted to an un-stayed mast.

Sunfish was developed by Alcort, Inc. and first appeared around 1952 as the "next generation" improvement on their original boat, the Sailfish. In contrast, the Sunfish has a wider beam for more stability, increased freeboard and the addition of a foot-well for a more comfortable sailing position. Sunfish began as a wood hull design and progressed to fiberglass construction just a few years after its introduction.

Having a lateen sail with its simple two line rigging makes a Sunfish simple to learn sailing on and to set up. Upgrades can be added to enhance sail control for competitive sailing, making the boat attractive to both novice and experienced sailors alike.

Due to the broad appeal of the Sunfish, in 1995 it was commended by The American Sailboat Hall of Fame for being "the most popular fiberglass boat ever designed, with a quarter million sold worldwide" (at that point in time). Today, the Sunfish brand-name has become so widely known it is often misapplied generically to refer to any brand board-style boat sporting the characteristic lateen sail. Currently manufactured by LaserPerformance.

Litigation and controversies

Breach of contract, unlawful Counterfeiting and Trademark Infringement
On March 4, 2013, Bruce Kirby, Inc., filed a complaint in the U.S. Federal Court District of Connecticut, alleging unlawful counterfeiting of the Kirby dinghy globally recognized as the Laser by LaserPerformance. LaserPerformance is the legal intellectual property owner of the Laser brand globally except in Oceania (includes Australia, New Zealand), Japan, and Korea.

This case also names the International Laser Class Association (ILCA) and the International Sailing Federation (ISAF) alleging they assisted LaserPerformance by continuing to supply ISAF plaques to the builder, after Kirby had given them formal notice to stop.

On June 13, 2013 LaserPerformance filed its Answer and Counter Claims in the United States District Court, District of Connecticut, alleging a scheme by Bruce Kirby, Inc., Global Sailing Limited, and Performance Sailcraft Pty. Ltd.

On February 14, 2020 a Connecticut Court gives $6m verdict in favor of Laser designer Bruce Kirby in long running dispute with LaserPerformance.

Laser Class 
On March 27, 2019, laser class revoked LaserPerformance's license to build Lasers.

Today
LaserPerformance now builds and sells a wide range of racing and recreational sailboat dinghies, including the Laser, Laser Pico, Laser Bahia, Laser Vago, Sunfish,  Club FJ, Club 420,  Dart 16, and Bug. At 2022 new boats Cascais and Portstar

As of summer 2021 LaserPerformance remains in negotiations with the ILCA and has not signed a Builders Agreement for Laser dinghies.

References

External links
Company website

LaserPerformance